Matthis Abline (born 28 March 2003) is a French professional footballer who plays as a forward for Ligue 1 club Auxerre, on loan from Rennes.

Club career 
On 20 August 2020, Abline signed his first professional contract with Rennes. He made his professional debut for Rennes on 25 April 2021 in a 5–1 Ligue 1 win against Dijon. He scored his first goal against Rosenborg in the 2021–22 UEFA Europa Conference League play-off round.

On 21 January 2022, Abline joined Le Havre on loan until the end of the season.

Career statistics

References

External links
 

2003 births
Living people
Sportspeople from Angers
French footballers
Association football forwards
France youth international footballers
Stade Rennais F.C. players
AJ Auxerre players
Le Havre AC players
Ligue 1 players
Ligue 2 players
Championnat National 3 players
Footballers from Pays de la Loire